The Baby Squad  is a football hooligan firm linked to the English Premier League team, Leicester City.

History
The Baby Squad have had a number of fights with the Chelsea Headhunters who follow Chelsea. In August 2000, Leicester were listed as the 7th most violent football club in England and Wales. In November 2001, the Baby Squad were ambushed by  hooligans from Luton Town, called the MiGs, at Leicester railway station before police split up the two groups.

In February 2008, eleven men were arrested after up to 100 hooligans were involved in running battles between fans from Leicester City and Coventry City outside a pub in Coventry. Police confiscated knives and one man suffered minor head injuries.

The week before the incident with Coventry fans, 13 men were arrested after clashes between fans from Leicester and Norwich in which some men sustained minor injuries.

References

Further reading
 Nicholls, Andy (2005). Hooligans: A-L of Britain's Football Gangs, Milo Books, 

Leicester City F.C.
British football hooligan firms
Gangs in England